Tutuiyeh (also Romanized as Tūtū’īyeh; also known as Now Tū’īyeh) is a village in Pariz Rural District, Pariz District, Sirjan County, Kerman Province, Iran. At the 2006 census, its population was 23, in 12 families.

References 

Populated places in Sirjan County